Banning Unified School District is located in the central part of Riverside County in California. The district services the city of Banning, California and the unincorporated area of Cabazon.

It is composed of one high school, one middle school, four elementary schools and one alternative education center.

Schools

Elementary schools 
 Cabazon Elementary – Principal, Jonny Baker
 Central Elementary – Principal, Marcia Cole
 Hemmerling Elementary – Principal, Alisha Norman
 Hoffer Elementary – Coordinator, Matt Beilstein

Middle school 
 Nicolet Middle School – Principal, Kelly Daly

High school 
 Banning High School (BHS) Broncos – Principal, Matt Valdivia

Alternative Education Centers 
 Coombs Alternative Education School- Acting Coordinator, David Sanchez

Current School Board Trustees

 Alfredo Andrade, President
 Jason Smith, Clerk
 Kerri Mariner, Member
 George Moyer, Provisional Member
 Alex Cassadas, Member

References

External links
 

School districts in Riverside County, California